Greenwich Council  may refer to:

Greenwich Council (Boy Scouts of America)
Greenwich Metropolitan Borough Council
Greenwich London Borough Council